Epic is the second studio album by American singer–songwriter Sharon Van Etten. The album was released on September 21, 2010.

Epic was recorded and mixed over 11 days in Philadelphia between May 28, 2010 and June 6, 2010 at Miner Street Recordings with producer Brian McTear. The album features guest performances by singers Cat Martino and Meg Baird; Jessica Larrabee and Andy LaPlant of the band She Keeps Bees; and David Hartley of The War on Drugs and the band Nightlands.

The final song on the album, "Love More" was originally recorded as part of the Shaking Through documentary video series produced by Weathervane Music, and has been covered in concert by high-profile artists such as Bon Iver, Dave Alvin, and The National.

In 2021, a tenth-anniversary version of the album was released. The release included a track-by-track cover album by various artists.

Track listing

All songs written by Sharon Van Etten.

References

2010 albums
Sharon Van Etten albums